Teg49 is a non-coding RNA present in the extended  promoter region of the staphylococcal accessory regulator sarA. It was identified by RNA-seq and confirmed by  Northern blot. It is modulated by sigB (sarA regulator) and cshA  (an ATP-dependant DEAD box RNA helicase) and it most likely contributes to virulence of S. aureus by modulating SarA expression.

References 

Non-coding RNA